Taylor High School is a public high school in Cleves, Ohio. It is the only high school in the Three Rivers Local School District. It has been given the designation as an "Excellent with Distinction School" from the state of Ohio since such designations have been in effect. The School District and the High School serve all of  Miami Township, which includes the villages of Cleves and  North Bend. The Yellow Jackets are a long time member of the  Cincinnati Hills League. The schools primary league rivals are the  Wyoming Cowboys and the  Finneytown Wildcats.

Ohio High School Athletic Association State Championships

 Boys Baseball – 1949, 1962
 Girls Cross Country – 2002, 2004

Notable alumni
 Phil Clark, former NFL player
 Dana Stubblefield, former NFL player
 Pamela Myers, actress

New School
The Three Rivers School District received a grant from the state of Ohio to fund the building of a new school. The district chose to build a Pre-K to 12 school, as many of the buildings in the district are aging. On March 8 the Three Rivers Board of Education approved the contracts for the new building. The groundbreaking took place on September 18, 2011 and construction has kept on pace since this time. The school began classes on schedule on September 9, 2013.

References

External links
 District Website
High schools in Hamilton County, Ohio
Public high schools in Ohio